Roberto Bergamaschi may refer to:

Roberto Bergamaschi (footballer) (born 1960), Italian footballer
Roberto Bergamaschi (professor), professor and colorectal surgery specialist